The Hanover Theatre and Conservatory for the Performing Arts in Worcester, Massachusetts, United States was originally built in 1904 as the Franklin Square Theatre regularly scheduling burlesque shows, Broadway touring shows and headline acts transitioning to showing silent films by 1912 when vaudeville magnate Sylvester Poli purchased the theatre from the estate of Pauline L. Taylor.

History
Opened in 1904, the Franklin Square Theatre was designed in 1902 by the local architectural firm of Cutting, Carleton & Cutting. It was commissioned by Ramsom C. Taylor, a prominent Worcester real estate developer.

Upon its sale, Poli remodeled the theatre, renamed it The Grand, and continued to show silent movies.  In 1926 he hired renowned theatre designer Thomas W. Lamb, doubled the theatre's seating capacity to 3,500 and transformed the building into a palatial showcase, including a two-story lobby with mirrored walls, marbleized columns, an ornate grand staircase, and an immense chandelier in the main auditorium, just in time for the beginning of sound film, or the talkies in 1927.

In 1928, Poli sold his theatre holdings to William Fox who then renamed it the Loew's Poli.  After another change of ownership, Sumner Redstone and Redstone Theaters purchased the building in 1967 opening it as Showcase Cinemas and continued operations as a multiscreen movie house until 1998 when Redstone's National Amusements closed the theatre.  In 2002, National Amusements transferred ownership to the non-profit Worcester Center for the Performing Arts, established by Ed Madaus and Paul Demoga.

After extensive fundraising efforts and building community support, the theatre opened in March 2008 and was named The Hanover Theatre for the Performing Arts, after one of the theatre's corporate sponsors (Hanover Insurance) donated much of the seed money to make the opening become a reality.

Today, the theatre has seating capacity for 2300 patrons, and hosts nationally prominent entertainers, Broadway national touring companies, family touring companies, as well as providing a local outlet for community based artists and organizations.  The Franklin Square Salon Gallery, located on the second floor, features art exhibits organized by ArtsWorcester.

The theatre, under the name Poli's Palace Theater, was added the National Register of Historic Places in January 2011.

The Hanover Theatre Conservatory for the Performing Arts was added in 2016.  The conservatory provides space for education and outreach and provides classrooms for acting and vocal training, and various aspects of theatre production including lighting, costume design, and scenic and prop design.  It also provides barres for ballet and movement training.

Gallery

See also
National Register of Historic Places listings in northwestern Worcester, Massachusetts
National Register of Historic Places listings in Worcester County, Massachusetts

References

History of The Hanover Theatre for the Performing Arts

External links
Official website
Exhibits at The Hanover - ArtsWorcester

Concert halls in Massachusetts
Buildings and structures in Worcester, Massachusetts
Theatres in Massachusetts
Performing arts centers in Massachusetts
Movie palaces
Tourist attractions in Worcester, Massachusetts
Loew's Theatres buildings and structures
National Register of Historic Places in Worcester, Massachusetts
Theatres on the National Register of Historic Places in Massachusetts
Thomas W. Lamb buildings
Public venues with a theatre organ
1904 establishments in Massachusetts